The Puget Group is a geologic group in Washington (state). It preserves fossils dating back to the Paleogene period.

Two key formations include the Renton Formation and the Tukwila Formation.

See also

 List of fossiliferous stratigraphic units in Washington (state)
 Paleontology in Washington (state)

References

Geologic groups of Washington (state)
Paleogene stratigraphic units of North America